Eremias grammica (commonly known as the reticulate racerunner) is a species of lizard found in Kazakhstan, Turkmenistan, Tajikistan, Uzbekistan, Iran, Afghanistan, Kyrgyzstan, and China.

References

Eremias
Reptiles described in 1823
Taxa named by Hinrich Lichtenstein